Edward Terence (Terry) Curran is an English former professional footballer whose career lasted from 1975 to 1988. Curran was an attacking midfielder, who could also play as a winger, and as an out and out striker. During his 13-year career Curran played for many clubs, although he is especially remembered by Sheffield Wednesday supporters for his part in launching the clubs revival during the late 1970s and early 1980s.

Football career
Terry Curran was born in Kinsley, near Hemsworth, West Riding of Yorkshire on 20 March 1955, he signed for Fourth Division Doncaster Rovers in July 1973 from non-league football. He made 68 appearances for Rovers scoring 11 goals in two seasons. Brian Clough was wanting to sign him but was put off by the asking price of £140,000 so he controversially told Curran's brother of his interest so Curran would not sign a new contract, thus reducing the transfer fee. He signed for Nottingham Forest in August 1975 with Rovers receiving £50,000 plus keeper Dennis Peacock and winger Ian Miller. In two seasons, he played 48 games scoring 12 goals for Forest, helping them gain promotion to Division One in the 1976–77 season. Curran lost favour after a disagreement with Forest assistant manager Peter Taylor, and made a written transfer request in August 1977, which was accepted. He was loaned out to Bury during October 1977 and eventually switched to Derby County in a £50,000 move the following month.

Curran stayed less than a year at Derby, making 26 appearances in Division One scoring two goals before switching for £60,000 to another First Division club Southampton in the summer of 1978. Once again Curran stayed less than a year at Southampton, making 26 appearances in the 1978–79 season and playing in the League Cup semi-final victory over Leeds United. It was after that semi-final in January 1979 that Curran was approached by Sheffield Wednesday manager Jack Charlton with the audacious request that Curran should drop down two divisions and sign for Third Division Sheffield Wednesday. Curran agreed to Charlton's approach and signed for Wednesday for £100,000 in March 1979. Curran started the 1979 League Cup Final defeat to his former club Nottingham Forest.

Curran's signing proved to an inspired acquisition for Wednesday, he was the final piece of Jack Charlton's side which went on to gain promotion from Division Three in the 1979–80 season. He was an immensely popular and successful player during his time at Hillsborough, scoring 24 goals in that promotion season. Such was his popularity that he had his own fan club and recorded a song called "Singing the Blues". Curran was involved in an incident the following season in a match at Oldham on 6 September 1980 when he was sent off after a fracas with Simon Stainrod causing Wednesday fans to riot, which led to the closure of Hillsborough terraces for the next four home games.

Curran stayed with Wednesday till the end of the 1981–82 season, he never repeated the scoring exploits of that first season and the team had a new goal ace in Gary Bannister, this and a deteriorating relationship with Jack Charlton led him to leave and sign for Sheffield United for £100,000. He made 33 appearances for United scoring 3 goals before moving to Everton for three years (having spent some time on loan there the previous season) during which time he made only 24 appearances. He was at the club when they won the First Division in the 1984-85 season, a triumph to which Curran contributed 9 appearances. He then played briefly at Huddersfield Town before going abroad to play for Greek club Panionios NFC. He returned in October 1986 to play short spells for Hull City, Sunderland, Grantham Town, Grimsby Town and Chesterfield before retiring from playing in 1988.

Coaching career
Since retiring Curran has managed non-league Goole Town and Mossley, he left Mossley in December 1992 and invested in a hotel in West Yorkshire which he managed.

In October 2012, his autobiography "Regrets of a Football Maverick" was published.

References

External links 
 Blue and White Wizards, Daniel Gordon, 
 Terry Curran at Football Heroes
 Terry Curran at Official Grantham Town website
 Terry Curran at football-england.com

1955 births
Living people
People from Hemsworth
English footballers
Åtvidabergs FF players
Bury F.C. players
Chesterfield F.C. players
Derby County F.C. players
Doncaster Rovers F.C. players
Everton F.C. players
Goole Town F.C. players
Grantham Town F.C. players
Grimsby Town F.C. players
Huddersfield Town A.F.C. players
Hull City A.F.C. players
Mossley A.F.C. managers
Nottingham Forest F.C. players
Panionios F.C. players
Sheffield United F.C. players
Sheffield Wednesday F.C. players
Southampton F.C. players
Sunderland A.F.C. players
Allsvenskan players
English expatriate footballers
Expatriate footballers in Sweden
Expatriate footballers in Greece
Association football wingers
English football managers